Jamie King (born 1972) is an American choreographer and director.

Jamie King may also refer to:

 Jamie King (producer), filmmaker, writer, and activist
 Jaime King (born 1979), American actress and model, sometimes billed as James King
 Jamie Thomas King (born 1981), British actor
 Jamie King, Northern Irish bassist in the band Fighting with Wire
 Ja'mie King, fictional character in the Australian TV comedy series We Can Be Heroes and Summer Heights High
 Jamie King, fictional character in the American sitcom The Jamie Foxx Show played by Jamie Foxx
 Jamie King (curler) (born 1973), Canadian curler

See also
James King (disambiguation)